The Vanuatu national futsal team is controlled by the Vanuatu Football Federation, the governing body for futsal in Vanuatu and represents the country in international futsal competitions, such as the World Cup and the Oceanian Futsal Championship.

Tournament records

FIFA Futsal World Cup record

Oceanian Futsal Championship record

Current squad

References

External links
 Vanuatu Football Federation

Vanuatu
National sports teams of Vanuatu
national